Claudia Sprenger (born 22 March 1958) is a Liechtensteiner cross-country skier. She competed in two events at the 1976 Winter Olympics. In the 5 kilometer Women's Cross-Country Ski event, Sprenger placed 40th, and in the 10 kilometer Women's Cross-Country Ski event, she placed 38th. She was 17 years old when she competed in the Olympics.

References

External links
 

1958 births
Living people
Liechtenstein female cross-country skiers
Olympic cross-country skiers of Liechtenstein
Cross-country skiers at the 1976 Winter Olympics
Place of birth missing (living people)